Paik Ji-ah (born 1 January 1963) is South Korean Ambassador to United Nations and the other international organizations in Geneva. She was previously the president of the Institute of Foreign Affairs and National Security of the Korea National Diplomatic Academy, South Korea. She is the first woman to be appointed to a deputy minister-level post in the South Korean Foreign Ministry.

Career
Jan. 1985: Joined the Ministry of Foreign Affairs (MOFA)
Jan. 1991: Consul, Consulate General of South Korea, New York, United States
Aug. 1992: Second Secretary, Permanent Mission of South Korea to the United Nations in New York, United States
Dec. 1998: First Secretary, Embassy of South Korea, Bangkok, Kingdom of Thailand
Feb. 2001: Secondment to the Office of the President
Feb. 2002: Director, Human Rights and Social Affairs Division, Office of Policy Planning and International Organizations, Ministry of Foreign Affairs and Trade (MOFAT)
Dec. 2003: Counsellor, Permanent Mission of South Korea to the United Nations Office and Other International Organizations in Geneva, Switzerland
Jun. 2006: Minister-Counsellor, Embassy of South Korea, Kuala Lumpur, Malaysia
Jul. 2009: Deputy Director-General, International Organizations Bureau, MOFAT
Oct. 2009: Concurrently Commissioned as Ambassador for Population Issues, MOFAT
Aug. 2010: Director-General for International Organizations, MOFAT
Dec. 2012: Ambassador-at-large for the Security Council Affairs, MOFAT
Apr. 2013: Ambassador and Deputy Permanent Representative, Permanent Mission of South Korea to the United Nations in New York, United States
Nov. 2015: Ambassador for International Security Affairs, Ministry of Foreign Affairs (MOFA)
Mar. 2016: Deputy Minister for Planning and Coordination, MOFA
Feb. 2017: President of the Institute of Foreign Affairs and National Security, Korea National Diplomatic Academy (KNDA), MOFA
Apr. 2018: Ambassador Extraordinary and Plenipotentiary to the United Nations Office and Other International Organizations in Geneva, Switzerland

References

Living people
1963 births
Seoul National University alumni
Paul H. Nitze School of Advanced International Studies alumni
South Korean women diplomats
South Korean women ambassadors